In geometry, the small rhombihexahedron (or small rhombicube) is a nonconvex uniform polyhedron, indexed as U18. It has 18 faces (12 squares and 6 octagons), 48 edges, and 24 vertices. Its vertex figure is an antiparallelogram.

Related polyhedra
This polyhedron shares the vertex arrangement with the stellated truncated hexahedron. It additionally shares its edge arrangement with the convex rhombicuboctahedron (having 12 square faces in common) and with the small cubicuboctahedron (having the octagonal faces in common).

It may be constructed as the exclusive or (blend) of three octagonal prisms.

External links
 
Polyhedra